"Solita" (English: "Alone") is a 2014 bachata song by American recording artist Prince Royce. The song was released in February 2015 as a single lifted from the deluxe edition of Royce's third studio album, Soy el Mismo (2013).

Chart performance

References

2014 songs
2015 singles
Prince Royce songs
Bachata songs
Songs written by Prince Royce
Sony Music Latin singles